Born 2 Rap is the tenth studio album by American rapper the Game. It was released on November 29, 2019 via eOne Music (now known today as MNRK Music Group). Its release coincided with the Game's fortieth birthday. It was advertised as his final album before retiring, although Game resumed his recording career in 2021. It features guest appearances from Dom Kennedy, Ed Sheeran, 21 Savage, Anderson .Paak, Bryson Tiller, Chris Brown, D Smoke, J. Stone, Just Liv, Masego, Marsha Ambrosius, Miguel, Mozzy, Nipsey Hussle, Osbe Chill, Red Café, Sly Pyper, ToBi, Travis Barker and Trey Songz.

Background
The Game announced Born 2 Rap as his final album, stating on social media: "I've had a great run & surpassed my rap goals a long time ago. It will always be 'QUALITY' over 'QUANTITY' from where I stand. The REAL music will always prevail & this album will cap off an amazing run".

Critical reception

Born 2 Rap was met with widespread critical acclaim. At Metacritic, which assigns a weighted average rating out of 100 to reviews from mainstream publications, this release received an average score of 82, based on four reviews.

RapReviews.com critic Steve 'Flash' Juon said, "Both the length and the effort he put into it justify why it took over three years for it to come out and all the bases are covered here. ... It's hard to find anything to complain about". AllMusic's Fred Thomas said, "It's a dense volume of street storytelling and especially reflective lyricism from this rap MVP, and even at its extensive running time, Born 2 Rap delivers lots of highlights". Will Lavin of NME said, "Born 2 Rap isn't just a library of classic records blended together: it's a lesson in storytelling, something The Game has never received enough credit for. ... There's a flawless project somewhere among the album's 25 tracks, which could certainly do with trimming". Aaron McKrell of HipHopDX said, "As it stands, Born 2 Rap is a proclaimed swan song that feels more like a playlist. Let's hope Jayceon has one more in him".

Track listing

Notes
 "Born 2 Rap" features outro vocals by Nipsey Hussle
 "I Didn't Wanna Write This Song" features additional vocals by Dom Kennedy

Sample credits
 "Five Hundred Dollar Candles" contains an excerpt from Crips and Bloods 80s Interview (2016), courtesy of CBS News, and uncredited elements of "If Light Escapes", written by April George and Matthew Thompson, and performed by April + VISTA.
 "The Light" contains samples of "Open Your Eyes", written by Bobby Caldwell, Norman Harris and Bruce Malament, and performed by Caldwell.
 "Carmen Electra" contains samples of "Devil's Pie, written by Christopher Martin and Michael D'Angelo Archer, and performed by D'Angelo.
 "Gold Daytonas" contains a sample of "Get Money", written by Roy Ayers, James Bedford, Lamont Porter, Sylvia Striplin and Christopher Wallace, and performed by Junior M.A.F.I.A.
 "Gucci Flip Flops" contains a sample from "Dead Presidents", written by Shawn Carter, Davis Willis, Lonnie Liston Smith, Nasir Jones and Peter O. Phillips, and performed by Jay-Z.
 "Welcome Home" contains samples from "Shine", written and performed by Lamont Dozier.
 "I Didn’t Wanna Write This Song" contains a sample of "I Wonder If Heaven Got A Ghetto" by 2Pac.
 "Hug the Block" contains interpolations of "Selfish", written by Aretha Franklin, R.L. Altman III, Jason Powers and Kanye West, and performed by Slum Village.
 "Stainless" contains an uncredited sample of "Winter Sadness", written by Robert "Kool" Bell and Claydes Charles Smith, and performed by Kool & the Gang.
 "Gangstas Make the Girls Go Wild" contains a sample of "People Make the World Go Round", written by Thom Bell, Linda Creed and George Perry, and performed by the Stylistics.
 "Rewind II" contains a sample of "Rewind", written by Nasir Jones, William Mitchell and Rick Rubin, and performed by Nas.
 "One Life" contains an excerpt from That Blackness, performed by Nina Simone, courtesy of the Estate of Nina Simone.
 "Roadside" contains elements of "Happier", written by Ed Sheeran, Ryan Tedder and Benny Blanco, and performed by Sheeran.
 "Blood Thicker Than Water" contains elements of "I Shall Wear A Crown" written by Deleon Richards

Charts

References

External links

2019 albums
E1 Music albums
The Game (rapper) albums
Albums produced by Focus...
Albums produced by DJ Khalil
Albums produced by Swizz Beatz
Albums produced by Travis Barker